"Red Light Avenue" is the first single from Australian rock musician James Reyne on his 1994 album The Whiff of Bedlam.

Track listings
 CD Single (4509976902)
 "Red Light Avenue" (Wayne Burt)
 "Field Hippy"	(James Reyne)
 "Red Light Avenue"  (Acoustic) 
 "Log Rollin'"	(James Reyne)

Weekly charts

References

External links

1994 songs
James Reyne songs
Song recordings produced by Stewart Levine